The Leizhou Peninsula, alternately romanized as the Luichow Peninsula, is a peninsula in the southernmost part of Guangdong province in South China.

History
Qing naval forces were stationed at the Leizhou Peninsula. During the 19th century, the area was a hotbed of piracy, many pirates, such as Zheng Yi and Wu Shi Er, were based in the area.

Geography
The Leizhou Peninsula is the third largest peninsula in China with an area of c.  located on the southwestern end of Zhanjiang, Guangdong with the Gulf of Tonkin to the west and the 30 km wide Qiongzhou Strait to the south, separating the peninsula from Hainan Island.

Geologically, basalt terraces account for 43% of the peninsula's area. The rest is divided up between marine terraces (27%) and alluvial plains (17%). Leizhou Peninsula is dotted with a few dormant volcanoes, beaches, and low-lying diluvial plains.

Leizhou has two separate volcanic fields: a Pleistocene–Holocene field at the northern end of the peninsula west of Zhanjiang  Leibei Huoshanqun) and the northern end of the Qionglei or Leiqiong volcanic field, which extends across the strait into northern Hainan   Leinan Huoshanqun). The volcanoes derive from the east-to-west tectonic extension and thinning of the lithosphere connected with the creation of the South China Sea's basin. There is also a third volcanic field responsible for some of the islands offshore  Huoshanyan Daoyu).

Wildlife
Hepu National Sanctuary of Dugongs was created west of the peninsula to protect endangered wildlife especially marine mammals. Vicinity to the peninsula, such as the Leizhou Bay has declared to be parts of the Chinese white dolphin sanctuary holding the second largest population in the nation. Dugongs still occur in small number. Some Bryde's whales, minke whales, and whale sharks still occur in the adjacent waters including Hainan Island and Gulf of Tonkin waters such as off Tieshangang District, Islands of Weizhou and Xieyang.

Critically endangered whales such as North Pacific right whales and western gray whales, humpback whales, and blue whales were once known to occur around the peninsula in the winter and spring to calve. Waters such as Wailuo Harbor were ideal habitats for these giants. These whales were heavily hunted and were wiped out by Japanese whalers in this regions. (Japanese whalers established whaling stations at various sites along the Chinese and Korean coasts including on the island of Hainan and at Daya Bay).

Climate
The peninsula lies in tropical South China. The region is under the influence of continental northeastern monsoons and maritime southeastern and southwestern monsoons. Typhoons occasionally occur, both from the Pacific Ocean and the South China Sea.

Towns
 Kouang Tchéou Wan, former French colony on the north-eastern coast of the peninsula
 Zhanjiang, a port city on the north-eastern coast

See also
 Stone dogs in the Leizhou Peninsula
 Volcanoes of Leizhou at the German Wikipedia

References

External links

 Stone dogs in Leizhou Peninsula
 A map of the peninsula's volcanic fields from the Zhanjiang municipal website 

Peninsulas of China
Volcanoes of China
Landforms of Guangdong
Gulf of Tonkin